Lepidochrysops southeyae, the Southey's blue, is a butterfly of the family Lycaenidae. It is found in South Africa, where it is found in Nama Karoo in the East Cape.

The wingspan is 27–30 mm for males and 28–32 mm for females. Adults are on wing from September to March. There are several generations per year, depending on rains.

References

Butterflies described in 1967
Lepidochrysops
Endemic butterflies of South Africa